KNSD (channel 39) is a television station in San Diego, California, United States, serving as the market's NBC outlet. It is owned and operated by the network's NBC Owned Television Stations alongside Poway-licensed Telemundo station KUAN-LD (channel 48). KNSD and KUAN-LD share studios on Granite Ridge Drive in the Serra Mesa section of San Diego; through a channel sharing agreement, the two stations transmit using KNSD's spectrum from an antenna southeast of Spring Valley.

KNSD's on-air branding, NBC 7 San Diego, is derived from its cable channel position in the market on Charter Spectrum, Cox Communications and AT&T U-verse. The station is also available on channel 39 on satellite providers DirecTV and Dish Network.

History

Early history
The station first signed on the air on November 14, 1965, as KAAR, owned by San Diego Telecasters. It was the first television station in the San Diego market to operate on the UHF band and was the market's first independent station. Initially broadcasting from 12 noon to either midnight or 12:30 a.m. (based on the length of its late movie), the station aired a mix of local and first-run syndicated programming, both vintage and more recent films, and reruns of several 1950s dramatic series. However, in the summer of 1966, KAAR cut its operating hours significantly, with sign-on time moved up to 5 p.m., and by that fall, the station was only broadcasting on weeknights with a 15-minute 7 p.m. newscast, a travelogue and a single black-and-white movie (which ran for a week at a time).

A short time later, in January 1967, KAAR made an arrangement with San Diego State College to air programming produced by the San Diego Area Instructional Television Authority from 9 a.m. to 4 p.m. daily, which was followed by two hours of cartoons; this lasted until the sign-on of educational station KEBS on June 12 of that year. Channel 39 then went dark and was subsequently sold to Western Telecasters Inc., controlled by the Texas-based Bass family, and returned to the air on February 2, 1968, as KCST (standing for "California San Diego Television").

For a four-year period from the late 1960s to the early 1970s, Western Telecasters tried to take the ABC affiliation from XETV (channel 6)–a station licensed across the Mexican border in Tijuana but which broadcast exclusively in English, with a studio facility based in San Diego. XETV had been San Diego's ABC affiliate since 1956 under a special arrangement between the Federal Communications Commission (FCC) and Mexican authorities, subject to renewal by the Commission every year. Upon the FCC granting its annual renewal to ABC/XETV in late 1968, Western Telecasters countered, claiming that the presence of KCST made it no longer necessary for an American television network to affiliate with a Mexican television station.

In May 1972, the FCC revoked XETV's permission to carry ABC programming. As the only commercial station in the market other than CBS affiliate KFMB-TV (channel 8) and then-NBC affiliate KGTV (channel 10), KCST took over the ABC affiliation in two stages: daytime programming moved to channel 39 in June 1973, followed by prime time programs and all other shows (including children's programs, network newscasts and sports) by July 1, 1973. Four months earlier in March, Western Telecasters agreed to sell KCST to Storer Broadcasting, which owned major network affiliates in the Eastern and Midwestern United States. The sale was completed on September 30, 1974; on January 1, 1975, Storer added a "-TV" suffix to the KCST callsign. The switch and sale changed channel 39's fortunes, transforming the low-rated independent into a major player in the market. Riding on the heels of ABC's ascent to first place nationally during the 1975-76 season, KCST also out-rated its network-affiliated rivals locally. By 1976, KCST had actually become the highest-rated station in San Diego, displacing longtime leader KFMB-TV.  XETV, meanwhile, operated as an independent station until October 1986, when it became a charter affiliate of the Fox Broadcasting Company (the station is now an exclusive Spanish-language outlet for Canal 5).

NBC affiliation
 
On June 27, 1977, in the wake of its new success as the highest-rated television network in America, ABC moved its San Diego affiliation from KCST to KGTV, causing an affiliation swap that ended with KCST taking the NBC affiliation formerly held by KGTV. ABC expressed dissatisfaction with how it had been relegated to UHF in San Diego, and had preferred affiliating with VHF stations in markets of San Diego's size long before its national ratings success. Under the circumstances, KCST's ratings success was not enough to save the affiliation.

In 1985, the Storer stations were acquired by Kohlberg Kravis Roberts & Co. Two years later, KCST and the other Storer stations were sold to Gillett Communications (former Storer flagship WTVG in Toledo, Ohio, was the only station left out of the sale and was instead sold to a local employee/investor group). On September 16, 1988, the station changed its news brand to News San Diego, and its call letters to KNSD to reflect the new name; it also adopted the on-air brand "Channel 7/39" (in respective reference to its cable and over-the-air channel positions). Gillett was restructured into SCI TV in 1991, after Gillett defaulted on some of his bond purchases. After SCI filed for Chapter 11 bankruptcy in 1992, the company's stations were sold in a group deal to New World Communications.

In May 1994, New World entered into a deal with News Corporation that would result in most of New World's television stations (which were primarily CBS affiliates, along with a few ABC and NBC stations) switching from their "Big Three" network affiliations to join Fox, causing the network's affiliations in the affected markets relocating from UHF to VHF stations. However, New World opted to exclude KNSD from the affiliation deal, since Fox's San Diego affiliation was already on the VHF band through XETV. Instead, KNSD was able to retain its NBC affiliation, and New World sold the station and WVTM-TV in Birmingham, Alabama to NBC in May 1996; the sale was finalized that August. Following the sale's closure, in January 1997, KNSD modified its on-air branding to "NBC 7/39". In October 1997, NBC sold a 24% ownership interest in KNSD to LIN Television; in exchange, NBC acquired majority control (76%) of its Dallas–Fort Worth affiliate KXAS-TV from LIN. The deal closed on March 2, 1998, marking the official launch of the new NBC/LIN joint venture known as Station Venture Operations, LP (which was controlled by NBC).

Under the traditional definition, KNSD is the only English-language owned-and-operated station of a major network in the San Diego market (however, several stations owned by Grupo Televisa on the Mexican side of the market are O&Os of that company's various networks). The station blamed its woes on its UHF status in the past, but as viewers migrated to cable television (San Diego has one of the highest cable penetration rates in the United States), along with the fact that most of the market's UHF stations brand by their cable channel placements or call letters rather than by their physical channel, along with former VHF analog stations operating their post-transition digital signals on the UHF band, the issues with the station's position on the UHF dial have been significantly reduced. KNSD had formerly owned low-power station KNSD-LP (channel 62), which was leased to Entravision Communications to expand the coverage area of Univision affiliate KTCD-CA (channel 17, now KBNT-CD).

In the spring of 2001, KNSD moved its operations into 225 Broadway, a high-rise office building in downtown San Diego that was redeveloped to serve as its studio and office facilities, which includes a glass-enclosed street-level news studio resembling that of the streetside studio at Rockefeller Center in New York City used by NBC's Today. In February 2013, LIN Media withdrew itself from the Station Venture Operations joint venture as part of a corporate reorganization. As a result, NBC regained full ownership in KNSD and assumed full ownership of KXAS.

KNSD shut down its analog signal, over UHF channel 39, on June 12, 2009, as part of the federally mandated transition from analog to digital television. The station's digital signal remained on its pre-transition UHF channel 40. Through the use of PSIP, digital television receivers display the station's virtual channel as its former UHF analog channel 39.

NBC's three owned-and-operated stations in California (KNBC in Los Angeles, KNTV in San Jose/San Francisco and KNSD) collaborated to launch the only regional Nonstop channel, NBC California Nonstop, in January 2011. On December 20, 2012, KNSD along with other NBC owned-and-operated stations began carrying Cozi TV, a rebranded Nonstop network focusing on classic television programming.

As part of the SAFER Act, KNSD kept its analog signal on the air until June 26 to inform viewers of the digital television transition through a loop of public service announcements from the National Association of Broadcasters.

On January 9, 2014, KNSD announced that it would not renew its lease for the 225 Broadway studios when it expires in 2016. On June 23, the station announced the purchase of a two-story,  building at the StoneCrest office complex on Granite Ridge Drive in the Kearny Mesa neighborhood for $9.6 million, which will be converted into a new facility for the station. The location was chosen due to its easy access to San Diego County's main thoroughfares, and no-cost parking for its employees. The studio opened on February 29, 2016.

On March 15, 2016, NBCUniversal's parent company Comcast pulled the signals of KNSD along with co-owned cable channels USA Network, Bravo, Syfy, MSNBC and CNBC from Dish Network's lineup as a result of a dispute between NBC and Dish. Dish claimed NBCUniversal was demanding it renew its carriage of 10 NBC-owned stations and 16 Telemundo-owned stations including those removed due to the dispute. XHAS-TDT, then a Telemundo affiliate, was unaffected by the dispute. Three days later on March 18, 2016, the company announced it would continue to carry KNSD and five other cable channels for another 10 days while seeking arbitration by the FCC.

On July 1, 2017, KNSD launched the Telemundo network on its third subchannel (KNSD-D3 39.20) as Telemundo 20 San Diego. That September, NBC agreed to purchase KUAN-LD of Poway, California, from NRJ TV. By December 18, 2018, Telemundo 20 San Diego was being carried on KUAN. KNSD switched its frequency channel to 17 on March 14, 2019 with KUAN sharing KNSD's channel, but continuing to be displayed as their prior channel numbers.

Programming

Local programming
Local lifestyle and infotainment program Streetside San Diego and Spanish-language newscast Noticias Mi San Diego (the latter of which was a holdover from KNSD's operation of KBOP-CA (channel 43, now KSEX-CD)) were local programs previously produced by KNSD; these programs, along with the station's weekend morning newscasts (which were restored in December 2013 as part of a gradual newscast expansion resulting from a benefits package offered to the FCC upon the NBCUniversal-Comcast merger), were canceled on December 5, 2008, as a result of budget cuts at the station. The station currently produces a late-night music and lifestyle program SoundDiego on Saturdays.

Syndicated programming
In addition to the NBC network schedule, syndicated programs on KNSD include Access Hollywood (and its live counterpart), The Kelly Clarkson Show, Jeopardy!, and Wheel of Fortune. KNSD is the only NBC O&O to carry the latter two. As of September 2022, KNSD (along with its sister stations KNBC in Los Angeles, KNTV in San Francisco, WNBC in New York, WMAQ-TV in Chicago, WRC-TV in Washington D.C., WCAU in Philadelphia, WTVJ in Miami, KXAS-TV in Dallas and WVIT in Hartford) is one of the nine NBC O&Os that carry and distribute programming either nationally or regionally.

Sports programming
When channel 39 switched to NBC in 1977, it became the default home station for the NFL's San Diego Chargers (by way of NBC's rights to air AFC games), airing most games until the end of the 1997 season, when KFMB became the team's new station of record with the AFC broadcast rights moving over to CBS. From 2006 to 2016, the station aired Chargers games when they played on Sunday Night Football; this still continues today despite the Chargers' return to Los Angeles after 2016. KNSD also provided local coverage of Super Bowl XXXII, which was hosted at Qualcomm Stadium.

The station was also the broadcast home of the San Diego Padres and San Diego Mariners. Padres games aired during two different periods, first in the 1971 and 1972 seasons, and again from 1984 to 1986; while the WHA's Mariners broadcast games on the station during the entirety of the team's existence. The station also carried any games that were part of ABC's MLB coverage in 1976, then over to NBC's MLB broadcasts from 1977 to 1989; this included the Padres' first World Series appearance in 1984; limited postseason games involving the Padres were aired from 1995 to 2000.

News operation
KNSD presently broadcasts 37½ hours of locally produced newscasts each week (with 6½ hours each weekday and 2½ hours each on Saturdays and Sundays); however, during the NFL season, the Sunday edition of the 6 p.m. newscast is typically preempted due to Sunday Night Football coverage. In addition, the station produces the sports highlight program SportsWrap, which is sponsored by local furniture store Jerome's Furniture and airs Sundays after the 11 p.m. newscast.

As KCST, the station started its news department in 1973; Harold Greene, who would later gain fame as an anchor in Los Angeles, served as its news director and lead news anchor. As a newcomer, channel 39's newscasts regularly placed third in the market, behind KFMB and KGTV, for many years. On October 28, 2005, KNSD began producing a nightly half-hour 10:00 p.m. newscast for WB affiliate KSWB-TV (channel 69, now a Fox affiliate), following owner Tribune Broadcasting's decision to shut down KSWB's in-house news department (KSWB continued to produce local news updates during its simulcast of Los Angeles sister station KTLA's weekday morning newscast from the station's Kearny Mesa studios). KNSD's news outsourcing agreement with KSWB ended on July 31, 2008, when that station resumed in-house news operations upon switching its affiliation from The CW to Fox.

In June 2009, the station outsourced production of its evening weather forecast segments to Los Angeles sister station KNBC, using that station's on-air weather staff; as a result, KNSD became the only network-owned station in the United States and one of the few television stations in North America to outsource weather forecasts to a co-owned station. In October 2011, KNSD resumed in-house production of its forecast segments with the hiring of three weather anchors (including chief weather anchor Dagmar Midcap, who joined the station from WGCL-TV in Atlanta) and the promotion of Jodi Kodesh from reporter to morning weather anchor. On December 13, 2010, KNSD unveiled a new HD-ready set for its newscasts, which mainly mirrors that of the "Window on the World" set used by Today; this marked the first major renovations since KNSD moved into the NBC Building in 2001.

On January 29, 2011, KNSD became the fifth television station in the San Diego market, and the last NBC-owned station to begin broadcasting its local newscasts in high definition; footage shot in-studio is broadcast in high definition, while all news video from on-remote locations was initially broadcast in standard definition. The station also implemented a new logo and on-air graphics package designed by NBC Artworks and the advertising agency Mother New York, which dropped the longtime "NBC 7/39" brand in favor of branding as simply "NBC San Diego". The "block" graphics and branding used in this period (which featured similarities to the design of the NBC Nonstop channels) were to be implemented by the remaining NBC O&Os (and were used by their websites during the same period); however, KNSD was the only O&O to use the scheme on-air before dropping it in July 2012, in favor of Artworks' new "Look F" standardized graphics that were first adopted by sister station KNTV (at which point, the station revised its branding to "NBC 7 San Diego"). On October 25, 2012, the station expanded its weekday morning newscast to 2½ hours, with the addition of a 4:30 a.m. half-hour.

On July 18, 2016, KNSD began using the new "Look N" standardized graphics. The graphics were first implemented by the NBC O&Os on the East Coast in Summer of that year; however, KNSD became the second NBC O&O on the West Coast to begin using the new graphics. Also, its theme music was also updated, by warp-speeding the NBC chimes in the "LA Groove" theme in all of its opens, making the first NBC-owned station to warp-speed its musical signature in its theme music. Prior to the graphics change, KNSD along with sister stations KNBC and KNTV revamped their websites on July 1, 2016.

On January 3, 2017, KNSD expanded the 11 a.m. midday newscast to an hour, following rivals KGTV and KFMB-TV. As a result of this expansion, the station moved the entertainment newsmagazine program Access Hollywood to the overnight slot of 2:05 a.m., subsequently preempting the network's rebroadcast of the fourth hour of Today. However, beginning on January 7, 2019, the newscast was cut back to a half-hour along with Los Angeles and San Francisco Bay Area sister stations KNBC and KNTV due to the premiere of the lifestyle show California Live which airs on all three NBC O&Os in California.

Notable current on-air staff
 Mark Mullen – anchor
 Dagmar Midcap – chief meteorologist

Notable former on-air staff
 Emily Chang – reporter (later at CNN and Bloomberg Television)
 Fritz Coleman – weathercaster (2009–2011; was concurrent with his duties with KNBC; now retired)
 Ron Fortner – anchor (previously with XETV, later at KTVU, deceased)
 Courtney Friel (later at KTTV in Los Angeles, now at KTLA in Los Angeles)
 Harold Greene – anchor (1973–1974; now retired)
 Roger Hedgecock – anchor (1991–1992, now a radio host at KOGO-AM)
 Jim Laslavic – sports director (1989–2019, recently retired)
 Joe Lizura – weather/meteorologist (1990–2006, subsequently at KUSI)
 Bill Ritter – Reporter (now at WABC)
 Rolland Smith – anchor (1993–1996, returned to New York)
 Anne State – anchor/reporter (2002–2008, later at WBBM-TV in Chicago and WITI in Milwaukee, recently left KOIN in Portland, Oregon, for San Diego rival KGTV)
 Lou Waters – news director and anchor (subsequently an early and tenured CNN anchor)

Subchannels
The station's digital signal is multiplexed:

See also
Channel 7 branded TV stations in the United States
Channel 17 digital TV stations in the United States
Channel 39 virtual TV stations in the United States

References

External links

NBC Owned Television Stations
Cozi TV affiliates
LX (TV network) affiliates
NSD
Television channels and stations established in 1965
National Football League primary television stations
New World Communications television stations
1965 establishments in California
Former General Electric subsidiaries